(1935 – 3 April 2020) was a Japanese engraver artist, photographer, and occasional politician.

Born (as Sukenori Akiyama) in 1935 in Tokyo, Akiyama studied engraving at Musashino Art School, the predecessor of Musashino Art University, and then worked as an industrial designer for an electrical company. He started exhibiting his own tin engravings and other work from 1965, and in both 1975 and 1979 stood in elections for Governor of Tokyo, bringing pop art into the process.

Exhibitions of his work have included "Akiyama Yūtokutaishi no sekai-ten" in Ikeda 20-Seiki Bijutsukan (Itō, Shizuoka) in 1994.

From 1999 until 2003, Akiyama was an adjunct professor at Sapporo University.

From 1992 until around 2009, Akiyama joined Genpei Akasegawa and Yutaka Takanashi in the informal group Raika Dōmei.

Akiyama appears in the film Yūheisha/Terorisuto (dir. Masao Adachi, 2007).

Work by Akiyama is in the permanent collection of the Tokushima Modern Art Museum.

Akiyama died on 3 April 2020.

Books by Akiyama

Tsūzokuteki geijutsuron: Poppu-āto no tatakai. Tokyo: Doyō Bijutsusha, 1985. 
Hōmatsu ketsujin retsuden: Shirazaru chō-zen'ei. Tokyo: Nigensha, 2002. . 
Buriki otoko. Tokyo: Shōbunsha, 2007. . 
Tennen rōjin: Konna ni tanoshii dokkyo-seikatsu. ASCII Shinsho. Tokyo: ASCII Media Works, 2008. .

Notes

External links
Akiyama's blog 
Akiyama's 1975 election poster (as linked from this page  within the MOMAT website)
Akiyama's 1979 election poster
Review by Seigow Matsuoka of Akiyama's book Hōmatsu ketsujin retsuden. 

1935 births
2020 deaths
Artists from Tokyo
Japanese photographers
Street photographers
Japanese engravers
20th-century photographers
20th-century engravers
21st-century photographers
21st-century engravers
20th-century Japanese male artists
21st-century Japanese male artists